

The Benjamin Cornelius Jr. House, also known as the Benjamin Cornelius Jr. and Rachel McKinney Cornelius House, is a historic residence located in Forest Grove, Oregon, United States. It was built around 1873 by carpenter Harley McDonald, one of the first settlers to offer architectural services in Oregon, and is one of only two houses designed by McDonald remaining in Forest Grove. Its Italianate form and Gothic details are highly distinctive in Forest Grove, while its veranda (added around 1900) exhibits Colonial styling. Benjamin and Rachel Cornelius, the first occupants of the house, had crossed the Oregon Trail via the Meek Cutoff in 1845; the Cornelius family was instrumental in the foundation of Hillsboro and the town of Cornelius during their lifetime, and Benjamin was also prominently involved in early real estate transactions in the area. Benjamin  was murdered in 1881, during the couple's tenure at this house.

The house was added to the National Register of Historic Places in 1988, and included as part of the Clark Historic District in 2002.

Notes

See also
James D. Robb House
National Register of Historic Places listings in Washington County, Oregon

References

External links

1873 establishments in Oregon
Buildings and structures in Forest Grove, Oregon
Houses completed in 1873
Houses in Washington County, Oregon
Houses on the National Register of Historic Places in Oregon
Individually listed contributing properties to historic districts on the National Register in Oregon
Italianate architecture in Oregon
National Register of Historic Places in Washington County, Oregon